Simon Kranitz (born 5 June 1996) is a German footballer who plays as a midfielder for FC Nöttingen.

Career
On 17 July 2014, Kranitz joined SpVgg Unterhaching on loan until the end of the season from VfB Stuttgart. He made 16 appearances in the 3. Liga for Unterhaching before he returned to VfB Stuttgart II.

References

External links 
 
 
 

1996 births
Living people
German footballers
Footballers from Baden-Württemberg
Germany youth international footballers
Association football midfielders
VfB Stuttgart II players
SpVgg Unterhaching players
SpVgg Unterhaching II players
TSV Steinbach Haiger players
FC Astoria Walldorf players
FC Nöttingen players
3. Liga players
Regionalliga players